Jiuchengia longoccipita is a coccosteid arthrodire placoderm from the Late Emsian epoch of Wuding, Yunnan.

Its skull is similar in form to those of Watsonosteus and Dickosteus, though J. longoccipita can be easily distinguished from them in that its skull is longer, and has anatomical features in common with homostiids.

References

Coccosteidae
Placoderms of Asia
Paleontology in Yunnan
Prehistoric animals of China
Fossil taxa described in 1983